Papilio chiansiades is a swallowtail butterfly from the Papilioninae subfamily. It is found in the Neotropical realm (South America).

Description
On the upper surface of the forewing before the hindmargin a large yellowish white spot; on the hindwing posteriorly some red discal and submarginal spots, the spots of the two rows separated from one another; the tooth of the 3. radial prolonged into a short pointed tail.

The wingspan is 52−55 mm.

Subspecies
Papilio chiansiades chiansiades (Ecuador)
Papilio chiansiades maroni Moreau, 1923 (French Guiana, Venezuela)
Papilio chiansiades dospassosi Rütimeyer, 1969 (Colombia)
Papilio chiansiades mossi (Brown, 1994) (Brazil)

References

Lewis, H. L., 1974 Butterflies of the World  Page 24, figure 17.

External links

Butterfly Corner Images from Naturhistorisches Museum Wien

chiansiades
Papilionidae of South America
Butterflies described in 1872